Root and branch may refer to:
Root and Branch Men
Root and Branch petition, presented on December 11, 1640

See also
Roots and Branches (disambiguation)